Abarema villifera is a species of plant in the family Fabaceae. It is found in periodically inundated riparian forests in Brazil, Venezuela and Bolivia.

References

villifera
Flora of Brazil
Flora of Venezuela
Flora of Bolivia
Near threatened plants
Taxonomy articles created by Polbot